Sean Biggerstaff (born 15 March 1983) is a Scottish actor. He is best known for playing Oliver Wood in the Harry Potter film series, appearing in Philosopher's Stone (2001), Chamber of Secrets (2002), and Deathly Hallows – Part 2 (2011).

Biggerstaff began acting as a child actor at the age of five and made his screen debut in the television miniseries The Crow Road (1996). He won a BAFTA Scotland Award for playing Jeremy Wolfenden in the television film Consenting Adults (2007). He also appeared in the feature films Cashback (2006) and Mary Queen of Scots (2013).

Early life
Biggerstaff was born in Glasgow, Scotland, growing up with his parents in Maryhill. He went to Parkview Primary School in Summerston and joined the local drama group, the Maryhill Youth Theatre, when he was seven.

Career
Biggerstaff gained his first professional acting role at ten, playing the son of MacDuff in a Michael Boyd production of Macbeth at the Tron Theatre, Glasgow. He then joined the Scottish Youth Theatre and spent six years with the group. In 1996, at the age of 13, Biggerstaff secured his first major TV role, playing Young Darren in the BBC production of The Crow Road. At 14, he was cast by future fellow Harry Potter actor Alan Rickman in his new movie, The Winter Guest, as Tom, a mischievous schoolboy. In a 2002 interview, Biggerstaff recalled: "It was while at the Scottish Youth Theatre that I was chosen for The Winter Guest. Alan Rickman (known to most of the kids as "the bad guy from Die Hard") popped along one day looking for two boys to accompany him to the coldest place on Earth, Fife, for two months to make a film. Myself and the suspicious character that is Douglas Murphy were the lucky ones."

Rickman later recommended Biggerstaff to the London acting agency International Creative Management and Paul Lyon-Maris. Within a week, the Harry Potter castings were being distributed. During auditions, the directors suggested that Biggerstaff consider the part of Oliver Wood, and he played the role in the first two films, returning for a brief appearance in Harry Potter and the Deathly Hallows – Part 2.

Biggerstaff's career since the first two Harry Potter films has included playing Henry, Duke of Gloucester in the 2004 television mini-series Charles II: The Power and The Passion; Matt in the world premiere of Sharman MacDonald's stage play The Girl With Red Hair; and Ben Willis in the short film Cashback for which extra scenes were recorded, and the piece was adapted into a feature released in 2006.

In 2007, Biggerstaff played Jeremy Wolfenden in the BBC 4 television film Consenting Adults which was nominated for BAFTA Scotland's Best Drama Award on 18 November 2007, and won him the BAFTA Scotland's Award for Best Actor – Television. He appeared in the film Hippie Hippie Shake. and appeared in Whisky Galore! (2016) with Gillies MacKinnon and Eddie Izzard.

In 2016, Biggerstaff played the lead role in French-Canadian Catherine-Anne Toupin's Right Now, a translation by Chris Campbell of À présent, directed by Michael Boyd, which was critically and commercially well received in Bath, London, and Edinburgh.

In 2017, it was announced that he would star opposite Georgia Tennant in the Big Finish audio series Jenny: The Doctor's Daughter, taking the role of Noah.

List of credits

Film

Television

Radio

Theatre

Awards

References

External links
 Sean Biggerstaff Official site
 
 EyeForFilm.co.uk – Interview about Cashback and Harry Potter

1983 births
Living people
Scottish people of Irish descent
Male actors from Glasgow
Scottish male film actors
Scottish male radio actors
Scottish male stage actors
Scottish male child actors
Scottish male television actors
Scottish male Shakespearean actors
Scottish socialists
20th-century Scottish male actors
21st-century Scottish male actors
People from Maryhill